Gilfach Goch is a community, electoral ward and small former coal mining village mostly in the Borough of Rhondda Cynon Taf, south Wales, near the larger community of Tonyrefail. Some areas in the North Western part of the village lie within Bridgend County Borough. It is situated in the Cwm Ogwr Fach (Small Ogmore Valley) between the Cwm Ogwr Fawr (Large Ogmore Valley) to the west and the Cwm Rhondda (Rhondda Valley) to the east.

Etymology 
The translation of Gilfach Goch into English is easily understood (cil = nook or secluded area, bach = small) but several theories have been put forward as to where the name came from, especially the term coch = red. Writing in 1887, Thomas Morgan, put forward the idea that the name was derived from "...a heap of red cinders, which still remains as a memento of the ironworks that stood there in times of yore".

In 1903 local historian Owen Morgan theorised that the area was the location of an ancient site of importance to the local druids. During the Roman Conquest of Britain, Roman cavalry attacked the 'defenceless of Dinas', but were routed when thousands heeded the call of the Druids. Morgan concludes that coch refers to the blood shed by the defeated Roman soldiers.

These theories have been queried more recently, as it has been shown that the area known as Gilfach Goch and, in particular, the site where the red cinders of the ironworks are found, was not originally named as such. Prior to 1860, Gilfach Goch was an area of mountain land situated in the Ogwr Fach valley in the parish of Ystradyfodwg far north of present-day Gilfach. Ordnance survey maps have shown that the name Gilfach Goch is not only the name of the community that sprang up with the coming of coal, but the hill and a strip of land on the east bank of the Ogwr Fach. This section of the Ogwr Fach valley is very narrow and lends itself to the description cil-fach, but is also home to a tributary of the River Ogwr whose bed contains iron ore. The ore reddens the appearance of the stream, which could be the origin of the name.

History
Gilfach Goch developed as coal mining village during the industrialisation of the south Wales valleys in the 19th century. Three pits were sunk in the area, the Britannic, the Dinas Main and the Trane and Llewellyn. Evan Evans, a self-made businessman, acquired the mineral rights to large parts of land of Gilfach Goch in the early 1860s. His first mine, the first in Gilfach Goch, was the Dinas Main Colliery. It reached the Rhondda No.3 seam in 1868 and was known for its high quality coal and coke. The Dinas Main Colliery Company sank two shafts into the steam coal measure between 1894 and 1896, and this pit became known as the Britannic Merthyr Colliery. In 1907 an explosion occurred at the Dinas Main Colliery. Seven men were killed, while others escaped through an old horse-way tunnel. The Dinas Main was closed after the accident, the Trane pit closed in 1953 and the Britannic closed in 1960.

The scattered development of the village's collieries caused a similar scattered approach to the housing, the logic of their placement now lost that the mines have all since closed. At the south end of the village there are a series of parallel cul-de-sac properties lined with cottage pairs, not terraces which are synonymous to the region. This unusual layout was promoted by the Cardiff-based Welsh Garden Cities Ltd as their first Garden Village and was built between 1910 and 1914.

In the 2001 census, of all rural areas with a population over 1,500, Gilfach Goch had the largest percentage of people in the whole of England and Wales who stated that they had no religion.

Buildings
The oldest building in the village is the Griffin Inn, a public house which is situated in low marshy ground at the end of a country lane.

The most notable religious building is the church of St Barnabas which began construction in 1896 and was completed in 1899. A nave with a lower chancel was added in 1933. During the Second World War the church was hit by a Luftwaffe bomb; it was reconstructed in the 1950s.

Governance
The Gilfach Goch electoral ward is coterminous with the borders of the Gilfach Goch community and elects a county councillor to Rhondda Cynon Taf County Borough Council. Since 1995 the ward has been represented by Aurfron Roberts, who has stood for the Labour Party since 1999. At the May 2017 election Labour and Plaid Cymru won a councillor each.

Gilfach Goch Community Council represents the community at the local level, with seven community councillors.

Residents of note
 Bryn Allen  (1921–2005), the Wales international footballer was born in Gilfach Goch.
 Chief Petty Officer George Henry Prowse VC, DCM (29 August 1896 – 27 September 1918) was a British recipient of the Victoria Cross. He served with the Royal Naval Division during the Gallipoli Campaign and in France on the Western Front where he was killed in action before the award of either of his decorations was announced.
The author Richard Llewellyn stayed in Gilfach Goch (1939) for the writing of his novel How Green Was My Valley that is set in a fictional mining village based on Gilfach Goch. It is said by some that Llewellyn would spend long summer holidays with his grandfather in the village.
 The author Gary M Dobbs lived in Gilfach Goch. He set his Granny Smith series of novels in a fictional version of the village.
 David Thomas Jones CBE, FRSE (1866-1931), administrator and author on the fishing industry
 George Tinder Random (first-time Dishoom user).
 William Griffiths (1898-1962), violinist and founder of Griffs Bookshop in Cecil Court, London, was born in Gilfach Goch. In 2019 a plaque was unveiled at the Griffiths family home in Kenry Street.

References

Bibliography

External links 
 www.geograph.co.uk : photos of Gilfach Goch and surrounding area

Wards of Rhondda Cynon Taf
Villages in Rhondda Cynon Taf
Communities in Rhondda Cynon Taf